NorthRiver Yacht Club is a private golf club in Tuscaloosa, Alabama which officially opened in 1978. The course was originally designed by professional golfer Gary Player but was redesigned in 1997 and 2015 by architect Bob Cupp. The course features tifeagle bermudagrass greens. and is set up to both challenge expert players while being forgiving to beginners still new to the game.  The club also contains the Wee Links, which is an are for players to work on shorter shots, and practice greens for putting. 

The course is owned and Operated by Troon, who officially took ownership in 2015.

The signature hole at NorthRiver is the 17th, which is a par 3 hole featuring a green on a peninsula, surrounded on three sides by water.

Besides golf, NorthRiver offers 11 fully lighted tennis courts, a large outdoor pool open during the summer, and a smaller heated indoor outdoor pool that is open year-round. There is also dining at The Warner Lodge, a hotel.

References

Landmarks in Alabama
Golf clubs and courses in Alabama
Sports in Tuscaloosa, Alabama